Isobutyl nitrite, C4H9NO2, is an alkyl nitrite, an ester of isobutanol and nitrous acid. Its chemical structure is (CH3)2CH-CH2-ONO.

Isobutyl nitrite is a pungent colorless liquid. It acts as a vasodilator, and is used as an inhalant recreational drug, poppers.

Applications
Isobutyl nitrite is one of the compounds used as poppers, an inhalant drug that induces a brief euphoria.  Also, it is used as part of the antidote package for cyanide poisoning.

Safety
May cause headaches, dizziness and fainting. Isobutyl nitrite is poisonous to people with glucose-6-phosphate dehydrogenase deficiency.

References

Alkyl nitrites
Antianginals